Pasva is a rural locality (a settlement) and the administrative center of Poponavolotskoye Rural Settlement of Velsky District, Arkhangelsk Oblast, Russia. The population was 1,384 as of 2014. There are 21 streets.

Geography 
Pasva is located 93 km northeast of Velsk (the district's administrative centre) by road. Levkovo is the nearest rural locality.

References 

Rural localities in Velsky District